Legally Dead is a 1923 American drama film directed by William Parke and written by Harvey Gates. The film stars Milton Sills, Margaret Campbell, Claire Adams, Eddie Sturgis, Faye O'Neill, and Charles A. Stevenson. The film was released on July 30, 1923, by Universal Pictures.

Plot
A reporter Will Campbell gets himself arrested to get material for a story. He later gets a job as a bank teller but is hounded by a detective who knows Campbell is an ex-con. The detective is found murdered and Campbell is sentenced to death for the crime. He is hung just before he found innocent but a doctor revives him by giving him a shot of adrenaline.

Cast

Preservation
With no prints of Legally Dead located in any film archives. it is a lost film.

References

External links

1923 films
1920s English-language films
Silent American drama films
1923 drama films
Universal Pictures films
American silent feature films
American black-and-white films
1920s American films